Lactarius acutus is a member of the large milk-cap genus Lactarius in the order Russulales. Found in Guinea, the species was described in 1955 by French botanist Roger Heim.

See also 
 List of Lactarius species

References

External links 
 

acutus
Fungi described in 1955
Fungi of Africa